Jack Justin Smith (born 15 September 2001) is an English professional  footballer who plays as a midfielder for National League South club Dartford, on loan from  club Stevenage.

Career

Stevenage
Whilst a first-year scholar in the Stevenage youth academy, Smith went on the first team's pre-season tour of Jersey, as well as playing in a number of friendlies ahead of the 2019–20 season. He made his first-team debut as an 81st-minute substitute in a 1–0 home defeat to Bradford City on 20 August 2019. Having made two first-team appearances, Smith signed his first professional contract on 28 August 2019. 

The 2020–21 season would ultimately serve as Smith's breakthrough season in terms of regular first-team appearances, playing 30 matches in all competitions. At the end of the season, Smith was named as the club's Young Player of the Year.

Loan spells
Smith was loaned out to National League South club Braintree Town on a one-month deal on 11 January 2020. He made his Braintree debut on the same day. The loan agreement was extended for a further month and Smith made nine appearances for the club during his time there. 

Having made eight appearances back at Stevenage during the first half of the 2021–22 season, Smith joined National League North club Kettering Town on loan on 18 February 2022 for the remainder of the season. He made 11 appearances during his time at Kettering before returning to Stevenage.

Smith joined National League South club Dartford on an initial one month loan on 22 September 2022.

Career statistics

References

External links

2001 births
Living people
English footballers
Association football midfielders
Stevenage F.C. players
Braintree Town F.C. players
Kettering Town F.C. players
Dartford F.C. players
English Football League players
National League (English football) players